Abharella is a genus of trilobite in the family Anomocaridae.  The genus was first described from the Alborz Mountains in Iran, and has been found in France and possibly Turkey.

References

Anomocaridae